The UAC TurboTrain was an early high-speed, gas turbine train manufactured by United Aircraft that operated in Canada between 1968 and 1982 and in the United States between 1968 and 1976. Amtrak disposed of the trains in 1980. It was one of the first gas turbine-powered trains to enter service for passenger traffic, and was also one of the first tilting trains to enter service in North America.

Description

Chesapeake & Ohio design study 
A series of design studies carried out by Chesapeake and Ohio Railway in the 1950s used the second-generation Talgo design for their car suspensions. The suspension arms for each neighboring pair of cars were attached to a common bogie ("truck") between them, as opposed to having a pair of separate bogies for each car. The bogies rode the common curve between the two cars, centered by traction springs that centered the axle between adjoining car bodies.
TurboTrain cars are  lower than conventional cars, to lower the center of gravity in relation to the swinging point at the top of the arms. The arms included air springs to smooth out the motion, although it still felt "odd" while the train navigated short turns in switchyards and stations.

Like the earlier articulated trains, this meant that train lengths would be difficult to change. Their solution to this problem was to modify the power cars (engines) to allow the trains to be coupled end-to-end. Since articulated trains required "special" cars at either end anyway (to fill in the otherwise missing bogie), the C&O was double-ended, with a power car at each end. The power cars were organized with their two diesel engines on either side of the train, and the operators cabin in a "pod" on top. This left enough room for a passageway to run between the engines and under the pod to the nose of the car, where a coupling and doors were hidden behind a pair of movable clamshell covers. That way the train could be attached front-to-end with another, providing some of the flexibility in train lengths that coupled cars offered, while still being as lightweight as a normal articulated design.

TurboTrain 

C&O's early work went undeveloped until the 1960s. At that time two major forces began operating that would re-invent the concept as the TurboTrain; one was the US Department of Transportation's desire to update train service in the US as a result of the High Speed Ground Transportation Act of 1965, the other was CN Rail's desire to update their passenger service with the ending of "pooled service" (with CP Rail) between Toronto and Montreal.

United Aircraft Corporation (UAC) purchased the C&O patents to enter into the DOT's Northeast Corridor Demonstration Project. The TurboTrain was designed by personnel of the Corporate Systems Center Division (CSC) of UAC, at Farmington, Connecticut. The design was similar to the original C&O version, but modified to use turbine power instead of diesel. The PT6 uses a "free turbine" that acts as a torque coupler, so the new design did not require a transmission and was able to drive the powered wheels directly. The power cars had three engine bays on either side of the car and could mount engines in pairs for two to six turbines, depending on the needs of the carrier. Another ST6 drove an alternator to provide 'hotel' electrical power for the train.

The turbine engines were smaller and lighter ( with accessories) than the diesels they replaced, so the original power cars ended up being much larger than needed. Instead of a major redesign, UAC re-arranged the interior of the existing layout. The control room "pod" on top was lengthened to produce a viewing area with seating, and additional seating was added along the main level as well.

The ability to connect trains together remained largely unchanged, although the routing of the internal passage changed slightly to rise up into the observation area of the pod, then back down under the control room and from there to the nose.

The Turbotrains were evaluated by multiple journalists in the Canadian press as having "rail noise that substantially exceeds that of standard equipment" and having poor riding characteristics, especially on curves, with one journalist stating that "the single-axle articulation in practice negotiates curves in a series of short jerks rather than the smooth flowing motion promised in press releases".

The single-axle bogies on the Turbotrain were very mechanically complex and the suspension arms were "telescopic arms which were in essence ball-bearing screw actuators; the suspension of the inside-bearing powered bogies was "especially complex" and attached to the turbines via "an intricate web of mechanical couplings and shafts".

Production and use

U.S. service 

Two Turbotrains (DOT1 and DOT2) were built at the Pullman Works in Chicago. High-speed testing of the trains was performed from a base at Fields Point in Providence, Rhode Island, using track between Route 128 near Boston and Westerly, Rhode Island (track segments along this section, to this day, are the only areas where Amtrak operates Acela revenue service at 150 mph).

After its construction at the Pullman yards in Chicago, the Turbotrain was sent eastward on August 1, 1967, at regular speed and without passengers, to Providence, Rhode Island in order for UAC Aircraft Systems engineers to tear it down, study it for further development, and then eventual high-speed testing on the PRR's specially-rebuilt track between Trenton and New Brunswick, New Jersey.   

In a competition with a GE powered Metroliner on Penn Central's main-line between Trenton and New Brunswick, New Jersey on December 20, 1967, one of the TurboTrains reached . This remains the world speed record for gas turbine-powered rail vehicles.

On January 1, 1968, the TurboTrain program was transferred from CSC to Sikorsky Aircraft Division (SA) of UAC. The United States Department of Transportation leased both trainsets and contracted with the New Haven Railroad to operate them. The New Haven had been in bankruptcy since July 2, 1961; on January 1, 1969, it was absorbed into the Penn Central Railroad, which inherited the contract. On April 8, 1969, Penn Central placed the equipment in service on the Northeast Corridor between Boston and New York City. The TurboTrains were equipped with third rail shoes for operation into Grand Central Terminal. In their first year of operation the trains' on-time performance approached 90 percent.

After railroad bankruptcies and amid threats of more, the National Railroad Passenger Corporation (Amtrak) took over passenger service for most U.S. railroads, including the Penn Central, on May 1, 1971. Amtrak continued Turbotrain service between Boston and New York, switching to Pennsylvania Station as its New York terminal.  It also briefly ran Turbotrains elsewhere. Some service was from Washington, DC through West Virginia and Ohio to Chicago.

In September 1976, Amtrak ceased revenue runs of Turbotrain trainsets and moved them to the Field's Point Maintenance Yard in Providence, Rhode Island pending any possible sales to CN. An additional attempt was made to sell the units to the Illinois Central, but the poor mechanical condition of the trainsets caused the deal to fall through.

Canadian service 

In May 1966, Canadian National Railways ordered five seven-car TurboTrains for the Montreal-Toronto service. They planned to operate the trains in tandem, connecting two trains together into a larger fourteen-car arrangement with a total capacity of 644 passengers. The Canadian trains were built by Montreal Locomotive Works, with their ST6 engines supplied by UAC's Canadian division (now Pratt & Whitney Canada) in Longueuil, Quebec. The Canadian Turbotrains were originally planned to have been in service by the summer of 1967, but technical difficulties with the trainsets delayed passenger service entry until December 12, 1969; the primary failures concerned the auxiliary equipment and caused the power on the trains to go out.

CN and their ad agency wanted to promote the new service as an entirely new form of transit, so they dropped the "train" from the name. In CN's marketing literature the train was referred to simply as the "Turbo", although it retained the full TurboTrain name in CN's own documentation and communication with UAC. A goal of CN's marketing campaign was to get the train into service for Expo 67, and the Turbo was rushed through its trials. It was late for Expo, a disappointment to all involved, but the hectic pace did not let up and it was cleared for service after only one year of testing – most trains go through six to seven years of testing before entering service.

The Turbo's first demonstration run in December 1968, included a large press contingent. An hour into its debut run, the Turbo collided with a truck at a highway crossing near Kingston. Despite the concerns that lightweight trains like the Turbo would be dangerous in collisions, the train remained upright and largely undamaged. Large beams just behind the nose, designed for this purpose, absorbed the impact of the collision and limited the damage to the fiberglass clamshell doors and underlying metal. The train was returned from repairs within a week. No one was killed, though this event has been cited as a main deterrent to Canada's efforts to develop modern passenger rail.

Initial commercial service started soon after. On its first westbound run the Turbo attained  10 minutes outside of Dorval. During speed runs on April 22, 1976, it achieved  near Gananoque, the Canadian record to this day. However, in regular passenger service the Turbotrains were limited to 95 mph (153 km/hr) in Canada because of the Canadian route's numerous grade-crossings, estimated at 240 public highway grade-crossings and 700 agricultural or private crossings between Montreal and Toronto.

Technical problems, including brake systems freezing in winter, required a suspension of service in early January 1969. Service resumed in May 1970; however, technical problems again caused the Canadian National to withdraw all Turbotrains from service again in February 1971. At this point, the CN management publicly expressed great dissatisfaction with these trainsets, with one vice-president claiming, "the trains never did measure up to the original contract and they haven't yet"; the manufacturer United Aircraft Company publicly claimed that CN suspended Turbotrain service for relatively minor technical problems. Railroad analysts, including Geoffrey Freeman Allen (editor of Jane's World Railways), noted that the Turbotrains employed too many advanced, derived technologies which had been packed in "without
extended practical evaluation in railroad conditions. From transmission to suspension to auxiliaries, far too many vital components seemed to have been translated straight from the drawing board to the series production line.

During the "downtime" CN changed their plans, and in 1971 a rebuild program began, converting the five seven-car sets to three nine-car sets. Several minor changes were added. The engine exhaust fouled the roof windows of the power car, so these were plated over, and a grill was added to the front of the engines just behind the clamshell doors. The remaining power and passenger cars were sold to Amtrak as two 4-car sets. One of those sets sideswiped a freight train on a test run in July 1973 and three of the cars were written off. The sale of the surviving Power Dome Coach car was cancelled, and it stood spare until a sister unit caught fire and burned in September 1975.

The three rebuilt 9-car sets entered service for CN in late 1973. CN ran the Turbos from Toronto-Montreal-Toronto with stops at Dorval, Kingston and Guildwood on the Quebec City-Windsor Corridor. Original train numbers were Train 62 which left Toronto at 12:45 p.m. and arrived in Montreal at 4:44 p.m. Train 63 left Montreal at 12:45 p.m. and arrived in Toronto at 4:44 p.m. (Both were daily trains.) Train 68 left Toronto at 6:10 p.m. and arrived in Montreal at 10:14 p.m., while Train 69 left Montreal at 6:10 p.m. and arrived in Toronto at 10:14 p.m. (The evening trains did not run on Saturdays.) The trip took 3 hours and 59 minutes downtown-to-downtown on trains 62 and 63, while the evening trains were slightly slower, taking four hours and four minutes to complete the run. Turbo service was about a full hour faster than CN's previous express trains, the "Rapido". However, even the runs made by the Turbotrains in the late 1970s still fell substantially short of their intended 120 mph design speed; the fastest average speed for the Turbotrain in regular scheduled Canadian passenger service was an intermediate booking from Kingston to Guildwood (102 minutes for the 145.2 miles between the two cities nonstop at an average speed of 85.4 mph (137.4 km/hr).

By 1974, after substantial modifications of the gearbox device and pendular suspension, and reinforcement of the sound insulation, the Turbotrains finally took up untroubled service. CN operated the Turbos until 1978, when their passenger operations were taken over by Via Rail, who continued the service.

One of the three remaining trains developed an oil leak and caught fire on the afternoon run from Montréal to Toronto on May 29, 1979. It was stopped west of Morrisburg. It took some time for the fire engines to arrive as they were forced to drive on the trackbed. The power car and two coaches were totally destroyed. There were no injuries, although rapid disembarkation was needed. The train was eventually towed back to the Turcot yard in Montréal and remained there for several years, covered by tarpaulins.

The Turbo's final run was on October 31, 1982, when they were replaced by the all-Canadian LRC trainsets from Bombardier Transportation, which employed conventional diesel-electric locomotives. Although they had an early reputation for unreliability, according to CN's records, the rebuilt TurboTrains had an availability rate of over 97% for their careers with CN and Via. The LRC suffered from similar teething problems, notably with the tilt system locking the cars in a tilted position.

The withdrawal of the Turboliners was also precipitated by the rise in oil prices during the 1973 oil embargo and the following years, which destroyed "one of gas turbine traction's prime advantages, fuel cost economy".

None of the UAC TurboTrains were preserved.

See also 
 Gas turbine-electric locomotive
 JetTrain

Footnotes

References 
 
 Canadian National system time table October 27, 1968, to April 26, 1969.

External links 
 
 Video | The Jet Train Is Here (29:56) - National Educational Television and Radio Center
 1967 TurboTrain press conference - complete audio of the joint CN/UAC/MLW press conference announcing the TurboTrain.
 Sikorsky Archives - A brochure by Sikorsky Aircraft announcing the TurboTrain before it entered service. (archive.org)
 HO Scale models of the United Aircraft Turbo
 High Speed Rail Canada CN Turbo Train Public Archives

High-speed trains
Tilting trains
Rolling stock of Canada
Rolling stock of the United States
Gas turbine multiple units
Articulated passenger trains
 Scrapped locomotives